Jordan Branch (also called Jordan Creek) is a stream in Franklin County in the U.S. state of Missouri. It is a tributary of Saint Johns Creek.

Jordan Branch most likely takes its name from the Jordan River, in West Asia.

See also
List of rivers of Missouri

References

Rivers of Franklin County, Missouri
Rivers of Missouri